Lilli is a 2018 Indian Malayalam-language revenge thriller film written and directed by Prasobh Vijayan. It was produced by E4 Experiments and distributed by E4 Entertainment. The film began production in early 2017. It won the Kerala State Film Awards for Best Female Dubbing Artist for Sneha.

Plot
Lilli a pregnant woman gets a call saying her husband has been involved in an accident. While searching for her husband, she is  hit by a car, taken to a secluded location and tortured by three men who hope she can provide information regarding a young girl, whom Lilli pretends not to know about.

Three days later, Lilli  tells the men the location of the girl. Lili kills two of the men when the other leaves to search for the girl. As she lies on the ground, flashbacks show the girl was recruited to replace Lilli in a prostitution ring. Lilli had killed her dealer, stolen the money and rescued the girl . She sees her husband and realizes he had kidnapped her, wanting to know where the stolen money was hidden. Lilli  kills her husband. Her name is linked to the murders but she is missing. As the credits roll, Lilli walks with a baby in one hand and a stick in the other.

Cast
Samyuktha as Lilli
Aaryan Krishna Menon as Ajith
Kannan Nayar as Sali
Dhanesh Anand as Rajesh
Sajin Cherukayil as Philip
Kevin Jose as Anwar

Music
The film score was composed by Sushin Shyam.

Production
Lilli is the first movie produced by E4 experiments, a sister company of E4 Entertainment, and is distributed by E4 Entertainment. The film is edited by Appu Bhattathiri and cinematographed by Sreeraj Raveendran.

Reception
The News Minute wrote "The actors rise to the occasion, each one delivering a sincere performance, but the flawed script lets them down".

According to Alix Turner of Ready Steady Cut, the film is "[w]ell made, and with a strong lead, though the writing and direction could do with a little polish, Lilli is a grittier and bloodier film than we're used to setting from India".

References

External links

Indian films about revenge
Indian thriller films
2010s Malayalam-language films
2018 thriller films
Films scored by Sushin Shyam